Somatophylakes (singular: somatophylax, σωματοφύλαξ) were the bodyguards of high-ranking people in ancient Greece.

The most famous body of somatophylakes were those of Philip II of Macedon and Alexander the Great. They consisted of seven men, drawn from the Macedonian nobility, who also acted as high-ranking military officers, holding command positions such as general or chiliarch. Alexander the Great appointed Peucestas as eighth somatophylax after the siege of Malli.

Under Alexander the Great 
(Note that this list is speculative in several cases and would be disputed by scholars. For example, Hephaestion was probably not named as early as given below. The only complete list of Alexander's bodyguard in the original sources is found in Arrian (6.28.4), upon the extraordinary appointment of Peucestas in Carmania.)

336–334
Aristonous, Lysimachus, Peithon, Arybbas, Balacrus, Demetrius, Ptolemy.
333
Aristonous, Lysimachus, Peithon, Arybbas, Balacrus, Demetrius, Hephaestion.
332
Aristonous, Lysimachus, Peithon, Arybbas, Menes, Demetrius, Hephaestion.
331
Aristonous, Lysimachus, Peithon, Leonnatus, Menes, Demetrius, Hephaestion.
330–327
Aristonous, Lysimachus, Peithon, Leonnatus, Perdiccas, Ptolemy of Lagus, Hephaestion.
326–324
Aristonous, Lysimachus, Peithon, Leonnatus, Perdiccas, Ptolemy of Lagus, Hephaestion, Peucestas.
323
Aristonous, Lysimachus, Peithon, Leonnatus, Perdiccas, Ptolemy of Lagus, Peucestas.

See also
Companion cavalry

References
Heckel, Waldemar. "The 'Somatophylakes' of Alexander the Great: Some Thoughts." Historia: Zeitschrift für Alte Geschichte
Bd. 27, H. 1 (1st Qtr., 1978), pp. 224–228.

External links
Livius.org - Somatophylax

 
Ancient Greek military terminology
Military ranks of ancient Macedon
Ancient Greek titles
Military units and formations of the Hellenistic world
Military units and formations of ancient Greece